Bradenham Woods, Park Wood and The Coppice is a  biological Site of Special Scientific Interest in Bradenham in Buckinghamshire. It is in the Chilterns Area of Outstanding Natural Beauty, and it is described in A Nature Conservation Review. The site is part of the Bradenham Estate, which is owned by the National Trust. It is also designated a Special Area of Conservation. Grim's Ditch, a Scheduled Monument, runs through the site.

The site is mainly beech woodland, with a rich ground flora including rare species. Twenty-eight species of butterfly have been recorded. There are also areas of chalk grassland.

There is permanent access to the site.

See also
List of Sites of Special Scientific Interest in Buckinghamshire

References

Sites of Special Scientific Interest in Buckinghamshire
National Trust properties in Buckinghamshire
Forests and woodlands of Buckinghamshire
Nature Conservation Review sites